Coming Back Again may refer to:

"Coming Back Again", a song by Clay Walker on his 2003 album A Few Questions
"Coming Back Again", a song by Hostyle Gospel on their 2011 album Immortal Combat
"Coming Back Again", a song by Kings of Leon on their 2013 album Mechanical Bull
"Coming Back Again", a song by The Tea Party on their 2004 album Seven Circles